Daniel Gouffier (born 4 November 1937) is a French sailor. He competed in the Flying Dutchman event at the 1960 Summer Olympics.

References

External links
 

1937 births
Living people
French male sailors (sport)
Olympic sailors of France
Sailors at the 1960 Summer Olympics – Flying Dutchman
Sportspeople from Nantes
20th-century French people